Gustaf Armgarth (1 February 1879 – 3 March 1930) was a Swedish fencer. He competed in the individual foil and sabre events at the 1912 Summer Olympics.

References

External links
 

1879 births
1930 deaths
Swedish male foil fencers
Swedish male sabre fencers
Olympic fencers of Sweden
Fencers at the 1912 Summer Olympics
People from Tomelilla Municipality
Sportspeople from Skåne County